Marion Jones Farquhar  (née Jones; November 2, 1879 – March 14, 1965) was an American tennis player. She won the women's singles titles at the 1899 and 1902 U.S. Championships. She was inducted into the International Tennis Hall of Fame in 2006.

Biography
Jones was the daughter of Nevada Senator John Percival Jones, co-founder of the town of Santa Monica, California, and Georgina Frances Sullivan. 
 
Marion Jones  was the first Californian to reach the finals at the women's U.S. Tennis Championships in 1898 where she had a championship point against Juliette Atkinson but lost in five sets. She won the U.S. women's tennis title in 1899 and 1902, and the U.S. mixed doubles title in 1901. At the 1900 Summer Olympics, she was the first American woman to win an Olympic medal. Her sister, Georgina also competed in the 1900 Olympic tennis events. In 1900, Jones was the first non-British woman to play at Wimbledon where she reached the quarterfinals in which she was eliminated by G.E. Evered in straight sets.

She was mainly a baseline player who possessed a solid backhand and forehand and who had good accuracy in her shots.

She married architect Robert D. Farquhar in New York City, in 1903. They had three children: David Farquhar (1904 – ), John Percival Farquhar (1912 – 2013) and Colin Farquhar (1913 – ). From 1920 until 1961, Marion Jones Farquhar lived in Greenwich Village, where she was well known as a violinist and voice coach. She also translated opera librettos and for a short time was head of the New York Chamber Opera. In 1961, she moved back to Los Angeles, where she lived until her death.

Grand Slam finals

Singles : 2 titles, 2 runners-up

Doubles : 1 titles, 2 runners-up

Mixed doubles : 1 title

References

External links
 

Marion Jones at the Nevada Hall of Fame

1879 births
1965 deaths
American female tennis players
Olympic bronze medalists for the United States in tennis
People from Storey County, Nevada
International Tennis Hall of Fame inductees
Tennis people from Nevada
Tennis players at the 1900 Summer Olympics
United States National champions (tennis)
Grand Slam (tennis) champions in women's singles
Grand Slam (tennis) champions in women's doubles
Grand Slam (tennis) champions in mixed doubles
Medalists at the 1900 Summer Olympics